Dr. Fabian Chijiogu Ihekweme (born 4 March 1969) is a Nigerian politician born in Obowo Local Government Area, Imo State, Nigeria into the family of Chief and Mrs. Sabastine Ihekweme. He currently serves as the Imo State Commissioner of Foreign and International Affairs under the government of Hope Uzodinma

References

Living people
1969 births